This article provides an overview of human sterilization by country. While many countries permit voluntary sterilization for contraceptive purposes, some permit it only for medical or eugenic purposes. Additional restrictions may include minimum age, parental or spousal consent.

References

Human reproduction
Law by country
Legal issues in pregnancy